Near East Side or Near Eastside may refer to:

Near East Side, Chicago, a neighborhood in the northeastern portion of the Loop
Near East Side, Columbus, Ohio
Near Eastside, Syracuse

See also
Near North Side (disambiguation)
Near South Side (disambiguation)
Near West Side (disambiguation)